Piano Solos is an album by pianist Cedar Walton recorded in 1981 and released on the Clean Cuts label.

Reception

Allmusic awarded the album 4 stars.

Track listing 
All compositions by Cedar Walton except as indicated
 "Sunday Suite in Four Movements" 	
 "30° to the Wind" 	
 "Over the Rainbow" (Harold Arlen, Yip Harburg) 	
 "Clockwise" 	
 "Cedar's Blues" 	
 "I'll Let You Know"

Personnel 
Cedar Walton - piano

References 

Cedar Walton albums
1981 albums
Solo piano jazz albums